Verkh-Uymon (Üstügi Oymon) is a rural locality (a selo) in Ust-Koksinsky District, the Altai Republic, Russia. The population was 562 as of 2016. There are 12 streets.

Geography 
Verkh-Uymon is located on the right bank of the Katun River, 14 km southeast of Ust-Koksa (the district's administrative centre) by road. Oktyabrskoye is the nearest rural locality.

References 

Rural localities in Ust-Koksinsky District